Smith Fork is a stream in Clinton County in the U.S. state of Missouri.

Smith Fork most likely has the name of William Smith, a pioneer citizen.

See also
List of rivers of Missouri

References

Rivers of Clinton County, Missouri
Rivers of Missouri